Sajid Ahmed (born 10 July 1973) is a Pakistani politician who had been a member of the National Assembly of Pakistan, from 2008 to May 2018.

Early life
He was born on 10 July 1973.

Political career

He was elected to the National Assembly of Pakistan as a candidate of the Muttahida Qaumi Movement (MQM) from the Constituency NA-257 (Karachi-XIX) in the 2008 Pakistani general election. He received 134,498 votes and defeated Riaz Hussain Lund Balouch, a candidate of Pakistan Peoples Party (PPP).

He was re-elected to the National Assembly as a candidate of MQM from Constituency NA-257 (Karachi-XIX) the 2013 Pakistani general election. He received 125,405 votes and defeated an independent candidate, Farooq Khan.

References

Living people
Muhajir people
Muttahida Qaumi Movement politicians
Pakistani MNAs 2013–2018
Politicians from Karachi
Muttahida Qaumi Movement MNAs
1973 births
Pakistani MNAs 2008–2013